County Road 55 is a  highway which runs between the municipalities of Lom and Høyanger in Norway. The  section across Sognefjellet, known as Sognefjellsvegen, is designated a National Tourist Route. Also a short section at Balestrand is a National Tourist Route. The road reaches the highest elevation on the public road network in Norway, and it is closed every winter.

Prior to 2010, the road was part of National Road 55. The road has importance as part of the shortest route between Trondheim and Bergen, including a ferry. Usually a faster route is used, like those including Road 51 (663 km, also closed in winter, no ferry), road 15 (701 km, one ferry, used by express buses), or European route E39 (671 km, four ferries). This would create a winter open and ferry free road between Trondheim and Bergen much shorter than present alternatives.

Media gallery

References

055
055
055
National Tourist Routes in Norway